The 2016–17 San Miguel Beermen season was the 42nd season of the franchise in the Philippine Basketball Association (PBA).

Key dates

2016
October 30: The 2016 PBA draft took place at Midtown Atrium, Robinson Place Manila.

Draft picks

Special draft

Regular draft

Roster

Philippine Cup

Eliminations

Standings

Game log

|- style="background:#cfc;"
| 1
| November 20
| Star
| W 96–88
| June Mar Fajardo (25)
| June Mar Fajardo (16)
| Alex Cabagnot (8)
| Smart Araneta Coliseum
| 1–0
|- style="background:#fcc;"
| 2
| November 30
| Phoenix
| L 85–92
| June Mar Fajardo (19)
| June Mar Fajardo (23)
| Chris Ross (7)
| Ynares Center
| 1–1

|- style="background:#cfc;"
| 3
| December 3
| Alaska
| W 93–88
| June Mar Fajardo (23)
| June Mar Fajardo (22)
| Chris Ross (7)
| Smart Araneta Coliseum
| 2–1
|- style="background:#cfc;"
| 4
| December 11
| Mahindra
| W 94–91
| June Mar Fajardo (28)
| June Mar Fajardo (15)
| RR Garcia (5)
| Smart Araneta Coliseum
| 3–1
|- style="background:#cfc;"
| 5
| December 17
| NLEX
| W 106–80
| Alex Cabagnot (18)
| June Mar Fajardo (12)
| Chris Ross (5)
| Xavier University Gym
| 4–1
|- style="background:#cfc;"
| 6
| December 28
| Meralco
| W 101–86
| Marcio Lassiter (21)
| June Mar Fajardo (14)
| Chris Ross (5)
| Cuneta Astrodome
| 5–1

|- style="background:#cfc;"
| 7
| January 6
| Blackwater
| W 118–93
| June Mar Fajardo (25)
| Cabagnot, Ross (9)
| Chris Ross (11)
| Mall of Asia Arena
| 6–1
|- style="background:#cfc;"
| 8
| January 8
| Barangay Ginebra
| W 72–70
| Alex Cabagnot (16)
| Marcio Lassiter (13)
| Marcio Lassiter (4)
| Smart Araneta Coliseum
| 7–1
|- style="background:#cfc;"
| 9
| January 13
| Rain or Shine
| W 107–101 (OT)
| June Mar Fajardo (25)
| June Mar Fajardo (17)
| Ross, Santos (5)
| Mall of Asia Arena
| 8–1
|- style="background:#cfc;"
| 10
| January 21
| GlobalPort
| W 106–100
| Arwind Santos (31)
| June Mar Fajardo (15)
| Chris Ross (9)
| Hoops Dome
| 9–1
|- style="background:#cfc;"
| 11
| January 28
| TNT
| W 98–94
| June Mar Fajardo (20)
| June Mar Fajardo (22)
| Chris Ross (9)
| Ynares Center
| 10–1

Playoffs

Bracket

Game log

|- style="background:#cfc;"
| 1
| February 5
| Rain or Shine
| W 98–91
| RR Garcia (25)
| June Mar Fajardo (14)
| Chris Ross (4)
| Ynares Center
| 1–0

|- style="background:#cfc;"
| 1
| February 8
| TNT
| W 111–98
| Marcio Lassiter (22)
| Fajardo, Lassiter (8)
| Chris Ross (10)
| Smart Araneta Coliseum
| 1–0
|- style="background:#fcc;"
| 2
| February 10
| TNT
| L 85–87
| June Mar Fajardo (25)
| Arwind Santos (12)
| Chris Ross (7)
| Mall of Asia Arena
| 1–1
|- style="background:#fcc;"
| 3
| February 12
| TNT
| L 92–98
| Cabagnot, Lassiter (18)
| Fajardo, Lassiter, Ross (9)
| Alex Cabagnot (7)
| Smart Araneta Coliseum
| 1–2
|- style="background:#cfc;"
| 4
| February 14
| TNT
| W 97–86
| Chris Ross (31)
| June Mar Fajardo (15)
| Marcio Lassiter (10)
| Mall of Asia Arena
| 2–2
|- style="background:#fcc;"
| 5
| February 16
| TNT
| L 94–101
| Arwind Santos (18)
| June Mar Fajardo (15)
| Cabagnot, Lassiter, Ross (4)
| Smart Araneta Coliseum
| 2–3
|- style="background:#cfc;"
| 6
| February 18
| TNT
| W 104–88
| June Mar Fajardo (23)
| June Mar Fajardo (21)
| Cabagnot, Lassiter (7)
| Mall of Asia Arena
| 3–3
|- style="background:#cfc;"
| 7
| February 20
| TNT
| W 96–83
| Fajardo, Santos (22)
| June Mar Fajardo (19)
| Chris Ross (10)
| Mall of Asia Arena
| 4–3

|- style="background:#cfc;"
| 1
| February 24
| Barangay Ginebra
| W 109–82
| Fajardo, Ross (17)
| June Mar Fajardo (8)
| Chris Ross (8)
| Mall of Asia Arena
| 1–0
|- style="background:#fcc;"
| 2
| February 26
| Barangay Ginebra
| L 118–124 (OT)
| Arwind Santos (23)
| Arwind Santos (15)
| Chris Ross (11)
| Quezon Convention Center8,000
| 1–1
|- style="background:#cfc;"
| 3
| March 1
| Barangay Ginebra
| W 99–88
| Chris Ross (24)
| June Mar Fajardo (18)
| Chris Ross (8)
| Smart Araneta Coliseum16,773
| 2–1
|- style="background:#cfc;"
| 4
| March 3
| Barangay Ginebra
| W 94–85
| Fajardo, Lassiter (20)
| June Mar Fajardo (13)
| Chris Ross (9)
| Smart Araneta Coliseum17,146
| 3–1
|- style="background:#cfc;"
| 5
| March 5
| Barangay Ginebra
| W 91–85
| Fajardo, Santos (21)
| Ross, Santos (8)
| Chris Ross (10)
| Smart Araneta Coliseum20,217
| 4–1

Commissioner's Cup

Eliminations

Standings

Game log

|- style="background:#cfc;"
| 1
| April 2
| Meralco
| W 99–92
| June Mar Fajardo (24)
| Fajardo, Rhodes (12)
| Alex Cabagnot (9)
| Smart Araneta Coliseum
| 1–0
|- style="background:#cfc;"
| 2
| April 7
| Phoenix
| W 110–88
| June Mar Fajardo (22)
| Rhodes, Santos (10)
| Alex Cabagnot (7)
| Mall of Asia Arena
| 2–0
|- style="background:#cfc;"
| 3
| April 16
| Star
| W 103–97
| Charles Rhodes (29)
| June Mar Fajardo (11)
| Cabagnot, Ross (4)
| Smart Araneta Coliseum
| 3–0
|- style="background:#cfc;"
| 4
| April 19
| Mahindra
| W 109–80
| Alex Cabagnot (26)
| Charles Rhodes (18)
| Cabagnot, Rhodes (4)
| Cuneta Astrodome
| 4–0
|- style="background:#cfc;"
| 5
| April 22
| Rain or Shine
| W 111–98
| Charles Rhodes (26)
| Alex Cabagnot (9)
| Alex Cabagnot (7)
| Mall of Asia Arena
| 5–0
|- align="center"
|colspan="9" bgcolor="#bbcaff"|All-Star Break

|- style="background:#fcc;"
| 6
| May 5
| TNT
| L 103–112
| Charles Rhodes (43)
| Cabagnot, Lassiter, Rhodes (8)
| Chris Ross (10)
| Smart Araneta Coliseum
| 5–1
|- style="background:#cfc;"
| 7
| May 19
| NLEX
| W 114–112
| Charles Rhodes (37)
| Charles Rhodes (19)
| Chris Ross (11)
| Cuneta Astrodome
| 6–1
|- style="background:#fcc;"
| 8
| May 21
| Barangay Ginebra
| L 99–107
| Charles Rhodes (26)
| June Mar Fajardo (14)
| Chris Ross (9)
| Mall of Asia Arena
| 6–2
|- style="background:#cfc;"
| 9
| May 27
| Alaska
| W 109–97
| Alex Cabagnot (25)
| Cabagnot, Rhodes (10)
| Chris Ross (10)
| Ynares Center
| 7–2
|- style="background:#cfc;"
| 10
| May 31
| Blackwater
| W 124–113
| Charles Rhodes (32)
| Charles Rhodes (9)
| Chris Ross (13)
| Cuneta Astrodome
| 8–2

|- style="background:#cfc;"
| 11
| June 2
| GlobalPort
| W 112–101
| Charles Rhodes (34)
| Alex Cabagnot (10)
| Chris Ross (7)
| Smart Araneta Coliseum
| 9–2

Playoffs

Bracket

Game log

|- style="background:#cfc;" 
| 1
| June 6 
| Phoenix 
| W 115–96
| Marcio Lassiter (26)
| Charles Rhodes (11)
| Chris Ross (10)
| Smart Araneta Coliseum 
| 1–0

|- style="background:#fcc;" 
| 1
| June 10 
| Star 
| L 105–109
| Charles Rhodes (34)
| Rhodes, Ross (10)
| Chris Ross (15)
| Smart Araneta Coliseum 
| 0–1
|- style="background:#cfc;" 
| 2
| June 12 
| Star 
| W 77–76
| Charles Rhodes (21)
| Charles Rhodes (10)
| Lassiter, Ross (4)
| Mall of Asia Arena 
| 1–1
|- style="background:#cfc;" 
| 3
| June 14 
| Star 
| W 111–110
| Charles Rhodes (36)
| Fajardo, Ross (8)
| Chris Ross (8)
| Smart Araneta Coliseum 
| 2–1
|- style="background:#cfc;" 
| 4
| June 12 
| Star 
| W 109–102
| Alex Cabagnot (26)
| Charles Rhodes (10)
| Chris Ross (10)
| Mall of Asia Arena 
| 3–1

|- style="background:#fcc;" 
| 1
| June 21 
| TNT
| L 102–104
| Charles Rhodes (31)
| Fajardo, Rhodes (13)
| Chris Ross (12)
| Smart Araneta Coliseum 
| 0–1
|- style="background:#cfc;" 
| 2
| June 23 
| TNT
| W 102–88
| June Mar Fajardo (22)
| Fajardo, Rhodes (11)
| Chris Ross (9)
| Smart Araneta Coliseum 
| 1–1
|- style="background:#cfc;" 
| 3
| June 25
| TNT
| W 109–97
| Alex Cabagnot (28)
| Charles Rhodes (20)
| Marcio Lassiter (7)
| Smart Araneta Coliseum 
| 2–1
|- style="background:#fcc;" 
| 4
| June 28
| TNT
| L 97–102
| Charles Rhodes (22)
| June Mar Fajardo (9)
| Alex Cabagnot (5)
| Smart Araneta Coliseum 
| 2–2
|- style="background:#cfc;" 
| 5
| June 30
| TNT
| W 111–102
| Alex Cabagnot (28)
| Charles Rhodes (14)
| Chris Ross (11)
| Smart Araneta Coliseum 
| 3–2
|- style="background:#cfc;" 
| 6
| July 2
| TNT
| W 115–91
| Charles Rhodes (30)
| Alex Cabagnot (12)
| Alex Cabagnot (11)
| Smart Araneta Coliseum 
| 4–2

Governors' Cup

Eliminations

Standings

Game log

|- style="background:#cfc;" 
| 1
| July 29
| Blackwater 
| W 118–93
| Lassiter, McKines (19)
| Wendell McKines (12)
| three players (5)
| Ynares Center 
| 1–0

|- style="background:#cfc;" 
| 2
| August 2
| TNT
| W 97–91
| June Mar Fajardo (27)
| Wendell McKines (9)
| Chris Ross (10)
| Smart Araneta Coliseum 
| 2–0
|- style="background:#fcc;" 
| 3
| August 4
| Star 
| L 98–104
| Wendell McKines (27)
| Wendell McKines (22)
| Chris Ross (8)
| Smart Araneta Coliseum 
| 2–1
|- style="background:#cfc;" 
| 4
| August 25
| GlobalPort 
| W 115–112
| Wendell McKines (35)
| Wendell McKines (14)
| McKines, Ross (7)
| Smart Araneta Coliseum 
| 3–1
|- style="background:#fcc;" 
| 5
| August 27
| NLEX 
| L 100–103
| Wendell McKines (28)
| Wendell McKines (14)
| Chris Ross (11)
| Smart Araneta Coliseum 
| 3–2

|- style="background:#fcc;" 
| 6
| September 2
| Alaska 
| L 79–90
| Arwind Santos (29)
| June Mar Fajardo (14)
| Chris Ross (4)
| Angeles University Foundation Sports Arena 
| 3–3
|- style="background:#cfc;" 
| 7
| September 6
| Rain or Shine 
| W 103–96
| Chris Ross (27)
| June Mar Fajardo (14)
| Gabby Espinas (5)
| Smart Araneta Coliseum 
| 4–3
|- style="background:#cfc;" 
| 8
| September 10
| Barangay Ginebra
| W 107–103
| Terrence Watson (28)
| Terrence Watson (17)
| Cabagnot, Ross (5)
| Smart Araneta Coliseum 
| 5–3
|- style="background:#cfc;" 
| 9
| September 16
| Kia
| W 118–112
| June Mar Fajardo (41)
| June Mar Fajardo (17)
| Alex Cabagnot (8)
| Mall of Asia Arena 
| 6–3
|- style="background:#cfc;" 
| 10
| September 20
| Phoenix
| W 109–107
| Terrence Watson (26)
| June Mar Fajardo (17)
| Alex Cabagnot (6)
| Ynares Center 
| 7–3
|- style="background:#fcc;" 
| 11
| September 24
| Meralco
| L 101–104
| June Mar Fajardo (26)
| Terrence Watson (10)
| Cabagnot, Ross (7)
| Smart Araneta Coliseum 
| 7–4

Playoffs

Bracket

Game log

|- style="background:#fcc;"
| 1
| September 27
| Barangay Ginebra
| L 84–104
| Terrence Watson (30)
| June Mar Fajardo (22)
| Chris Ross (7)
| Mall of Asia Arena
| 0–1

Transactions

Trades

Pre-season

Commissioner's Cup

Governors' Cup

Rookie signings

Free Agency

Addition

Subtraction

Recruited imports

Awards

References

San Miguel Beermen seasons
San Miguel Beermen season